Tiburon is a coastal commune in the Chardonnières Arrondissement, in the Sud department of Haiti.
It has 21,170 inhabitants. It is situated in a valley, at the mouth of the Tiburon River.

Geology 
The valley of the Tiburon River, and the town of Tiburon sit exactly on the Enriquillo–Plantain Garden fault.

Settlements

References 

Populated places in Sud (department)
Communes of Haiti